Charles James Hughes Jr. (February 16, 1853January 11, 1911) was a Democratic U.S. Senator from Colorado.

Born in Kingston, Missouri, Hughes attended the common schools and graduated from Richmond (Mo.) College in 1871. He then graduated from the law department of the University of Missouri in Columbia in 1873, was admitted to the bar in 1877, and commenced practice at Richmond, Missouri. He moved to Denver, Colorado in 1879.

Hughes was a presidential elector on the Democratic ticket in 1900. He was professor of mining law in the law school of the University of Denver and Harvard University. He was elected as a Democrat to the United States Senate and served from March 4, 1909, until his death in Denver on January 11, 1911. He was interred in Fairmount Cemetery, Denver.

See also
List of United States Congress members who died in office (1900–1949)

Sources

 U.S. Congress. Memorial Addresses. 61st Cong., 3rd sess. from 1910 to 1911. Washington, D.C.: Government Printing Office, 1911.

1853 births
1911 deaths
People from Caldwell County, Missouri
Colorado Democrats
University of Missouri alumni
Harvard Law School faculty
Missouri lawyers
Democratic Party United States senators from Colorado
19th-century American politicians
19th-century American lawyers